The Italian Regency of Carnaro, also known in Italian as , was a self-proclaimed state in the city of Fiume (now Rijeka, Croatia) led by Gabriele d'Annunzio between 1919 and 1920.

Impresa di Fiume 

During World War I (1914–1918), Italy made a pact with the Allies, the Treaty of London (1915), in which it was promised all of the Austrian Littoral, but not the city of Fiume. After the war, at the Paris Peace Conference, 1919, this delineation of territory was confirmed, with Fiume (or Rijeka) remaining outside of Italian borders and amalgamated into the Kingdom of Serbs, Croats and Slovenes.

As a nationalist, Gabriele D'Annunzio was angered by what he considered to be the surrender of an Italian city. On 12 September 1919, he led a force that was about 2,600-strong and drawn mostly from former or serving members of the Granatieri di Sardegna brigade of the Royal Italian Army, as well as Italian nationalists and irredentists. Many members of D'Annunzio's force were reputedly veterans of the Battles of the Isonzo.

They were successful in seizing control of the city, and forced the withdrawal of the Allied (US, British and French) occupying forces. The march from Ronchi dei Legionari to Fiume, by D'Annunzio's so-called "legionaries", became known as the Impresa di Fiume ("Fiume endeavor", or "Fiume enterprise").

On the same day, D'Annunzio announced that he had annexed the territory to the Kingdom of Italy. He was enthusiastically welcomed by the ethnic Italian portion of the population of Fiume. This was opposed by the Italian government, which attempted to pressure D'Annunzio to withdraw. The government initiated a blockade of Fiume and demanded that the plotters surrender. During his time in Fiume in September 1919, Filippo Tommaso Marinetti praised the leaders of the impresa as "advance guard deserters" (disertori in avanti).

Modus vivendi 
On December 8, the Italian government proposed a modus vivendi recognizing Fiume's desire for annexation and promising they would "only consider acceptable a solution consonant with that which Fiume declared to desire." On December 11 and 12, D'Annunzio met with General Pietro Badoglio to try and obtain more concessions. Badoglio refused, and D'Annunzio said he would submit the modus vivendi to the Italian National Council of Fiume. The National Council accepted the proposal on December 15.

After the National Council's decision, D'Annunzio addressed a crowd of five thousand people and incited them to reject the modus vivendi, promising to put the issue to a plebiscite. The plebiscite was held on December 18, and despite violence and irregularities the results were overwhelmingly in favour of the modus vivendi. D'Annunzio nullified the results, blaming the violence at the polls, and announced he would make the final decision himself. He ultimately rejected the modus vivendi. According to Michael Ledeen, D'Annunzio made this decision because he distrusted the Italian government and doubted their ability to deliver on their promises.

Regency 

On 8 September 1920, D'Annunzio proclaimed the city to be under the Italian Regency of Carnaro with a constitution foreshadowing some of the later Italian Fascist system, with himself as dictator, with the title of Comandante.

The name Carnaro was taken from the Golfo del Carnaro (Kvarner Gulf), where the city is located. It was temporarily expanded by D'Annunzio in order to include the island of Veglia.

Constitution 
The Charter of Carnaro (Carta del Carnaro in Italian) was a constitution that combined socialist, corporativist and democratic republican ideas. D'Annunzio is often seen as a precursor of the ideals and techniques of Italian fascism. His own explicit political ideals emerged in Fiume when he coauthored the charter with syndicalist Alceste De Ambris. De Ambris provided the legal and political framework, to which D'Annunzio added his skills as a poet. The charter designates music a "religious and social institution."

Corporations 
The constitution established a corporatist state, with nine corporations to represent the different sectors of the economy, where membership was mandatory, plus a symbolic tenth corporation devised by D'Annunzio, to represent the "superior individuals" (e.g. poets, "heroes" and "supermen"). The other nine were as follows:

Industrial and Agricultural Workers
Seafarers
Employers
Industrial and Agricultural Technicians
Private Bureaucrats and Administrators
Teachers and Students
Lawyers and Doctors
Civil Servants
Co-operative Workers

Executive 
The executive power would be vested in seven ministers (rettori):
Foreign Affairs
Treasury
Education
Police and Justice
Defence
Public Economy
Labor

Legislature 
The legislative power was vested in a bicameral legislature. Joint sessions of both councils (Arengo del Carnaro) would be responsible for treaties with foreign powers, amendments to the constitution, and appointment of a dictator in times of emergency.

Council of the Best (Consiglio degli Ottimi): Elected by universal suffrage for a 3-year term, with 1 councilor per 1000 population, this council was responsible for legislation concerning civil and criminal justice, police, armed forces, education, intellectual life and relations between the central government and communes.
Council of Corporations (Consiglio dei Provvisori): Consisting of 60 members chosen by nine corporations for a 2-year term, this council was responsible for laws regulating business and commerce, labor relations, public services, transportation and merchant shipping, tariffs and trade, public works, medical and legal professions.

Judiciary 
Judicial power was vested in the courts:
Supreme Court (Corte della Ragione, literally "Court of Reason")
Communal Courts (Buoni Uomini, literally "Good Men")
Labour Court (Giudici del Lavoro, "Labour-law Judges")
Civil Court (Giudici Togati, "Robe-wearing Judges")
Criminal Court (Giudici del Maleficio, where "Maleficio" is a literary form for "wrongdoing", but it can also mean "curse")

Impact 
Benito Mussolini was influenced by portions of the constitution, and by D'Annunzio's style of leadership as a whole. D'Annunzio has been described as the John the Baptist of Italian Fascism, as virtually the entire ritual of Fascism was invented by D'Annunzio during his occupation of Fiume and his leadership of the Italian Regency of Carnaro. These included the balcony address, the Roman salute, the cries of "Eia, eia, eia! Alala!" taken from the Achilles' cry in the Iliad, the dramatic and rhetorical dialogue with the crowd, and the use of religious symbols in new secular settings. It also included his method of government in Fiume: the economics of the corporate state; stage tricks; large emotive nationalistic public rituals; and blackshirted followers, the Arditi, with their disciplined, bestial responses and strongarm repression of dissent. He was even said to have originated the practice of forcibly dosing opponents with large amounts of castor oil, a very effective laxative, to humiliate, disable or kill them, a practice which became a common tool of Mussolini's blackshirts.

Demise 

The approval of the Treaty of Rapallo on 12 November 1920 turned Fiume into an independent state, the Free State of Fiume.

D'Annunzio ignored the Treaty of Rapallo and declared war on Italy itself. On 24 December 1920 the Royal Italian Army, led by General Enrico Caviglia, launched a full-scale attack against Fiume: after several hours of intense fighting, a truce was proclaimed for Christmas day; the battle subsequently resumed on 26 December. Since D'Annunzio's legionnaires were refusing to surrender and were strongly resisting the attack using machine guns and grenades, the Italian dreadnoughts Andrea Doria and Duilio opened fire on Fiume and bombed the city for three days. D'Annunzio resigned on 28 December and the Regency capitulated on 30 December 1920, being occupied by Italian forces.

The Free State of Fiume would officially last until 1924, when Fiume was formally annexed to the Kingdom of Italy under the terms of the Treaty of Rome. The administrative division was called the Province of Fiume.

See also 

Doctrine of Fascism
Gabriele d'Annunzio
List of governors and heads of state of Fiume
Postage stamps and postal history of Fiume
Free State of Fiume
Italia irredentia
Pietro Micheletti
Rijeka

Notes

Further reading
 Reill, Dominique Kirchner. The Fiume Crisis: Life in the Wake of the Habsburg Empire (2020) online review

External links 

 The Charter of Carnaro
https://web.archive.org/web/20180509072247/http://www.reakt.org/fiume/index_2.html
https://web.archive.org/web/20180124083210/http://www.reakt.org/fiume/charter_of_carnaro.html

https://web.archive.org/web/20070212090316/http://www.crwflags.com/fotw/flags/hr-fiume.html
http://worldatwar.net/nations/other/fiume/
https://web.archive.org/web/20090715162114/http://www.karr.net/Constitution_of_Fiume/etexts.htm

Gabriele D'Annunzio
Italian irredentism
Italian Fascism
Fascist states
Geographic history of Croatia
History of Rijeka
States succeeding Austria-Hungary
1920 in Italy
States and territories established in 1919
Disputed territories in Europe
Italy–Yugoslavia relations
Former countries of the interwar period
Syncretic political movements
Italian unification
Adriatic question
Former countries